William or Bill Bray may refer to:

Politicians
 William M. Bray (1880–1964), Wisconsin State Senator
 William Bray (MP) (1682–1720), member of parliament for Monmouth Boroughs
 M. William Bray (1889–1961), U.S. politician, Lieutenant Governor of New York 1933–1938
 William G. Bray (1903–1979), U.S. politician, Representative for Indiana

Sports
 Bill Bray (born 1983), American baseball pitcher
 Bill Bray (rugby league) ( 1946–1948), Australian rugby league player
 William Bray (cricketer) (1879–1960), New Zealand cricketer

Others
 William Bray (antiquary) (1736–1832), English antiquary
 William Bray (priest) (fl. 1613–1644), English clergyman
 Billy Bray (1794–1868), Welsh Methodist evangelist
 William F. Bray (1877–c. 1960), Arizona architect, designer of Oddfellows Home (Safford, Arizona)
 William L. Bray, American botanist
 John Bray (communications engineer) (William John Bray, 1911–2004), British communications engine